Dewdrops Records, an outgrowth of an "uncommon music" fanzine run by members of a Cocteau Twins fanclub, was an alternative-rock record label active from 1993 until 2002. It was the joint project of Brant Nelson and Pat Mannion.

History
Dewdrops Records' first release was Thurtene (1993), a tribute to the British record label 4AD featuring 13 bands and 13 covers. Unsigned bands such as Hover, Red Zoo, and Orange appeared on the CD with covers of well-known 4AD songs like "Gigantic," "I Melt with You," and "Where Is My Mind?" Splashed With Many a Speck (1997) came not long after and was a second tribute album, this one featuring Faith & Disease, Lanterna, The Curtain Society, and Chicklet. This compilation was notable in that it featured the exclusive US release of a Cocteau Twins track "Touch Upon Touch" that had previously only been included on British compilation Volume 5. The label's final release was Half Gifts: A Tribute to the Cocteau Twins, released in 2003.

Discography
 Thurtene - A Collection of 4AD Covers (1993)
 Featuring: The Moon Seven Times, Hover, Immer Essen, Livia, Red Zoo, Independent Mechanical Industry, GLE, Clarity, Orange, The Gosh Guys, Floral Majority, Firecracker, and Tel Basta
 Orange (1994) - Orange
 Glisten (1995) - Elysium
 Almost Everything (1995) - Hover
 Dewdrops Primer 1996 (1996)
 Featuring: Elysium, Hover, Orange, The Moon Seven Times
 Splashed With Many a Speck (1997)
 Mandorla (2002) - Jane Rigler and Agustí Fernández
 Half-Gifts: A Tribute to the Cocteau Twins (2002)
 Featuring: Trance to the Sun, Translucia, An April March, Numeralia, Sugar Hiccup, Bethany Curve, Siddal, Subdew, Neil Impelluso, Halou, The Von Trapps, and Pumalin

References

American record labels
Record labels established in 1993
Record labels disestablished in 2002
Alternative rock record labels